Boss Fight Books is a Los Angeles-based book publisher and its eponymous series of books about video games.  Similar to the style of 33⅓, a series of books about individual record albums, each book focuses solely on one video game.  The company was founded by Gabe Durham in June 2013, and following a successful Kickstarter campaign in July, they released their first book, EarthBound by Ken Baumann in January 2014.

The idea for the series came when Durham was reading Jeff Ryan's Super Mario: How Nintendo Conquered America, as Durham wished that the book would slow down and provide more depth to the games it covered.  After finding there was no equivalent of 33⅓ for video games, Durham pitched the idea of the series to his friend, Ken Baumann, who agreed to write the first book and serve as the series' designer.

After securing agreements with authors for the first five books, Durham turned to Kickstarter, seeking $5,000 in funding, a target that was met within eight hours. At the close of the campaign in July 2013, Boss Fight Books had raised $45,429, allowing the project to proceed. As part of the crowdfunding campaign, backers got to vote on the subject of a sixth book, and Chrono Trigger, which had been considered but not included in the first five, was chosen.  Boss Fight Books returned to Kickstarter to fund a second season consisting of a further six books; it too was successful, raising $53,186 in November 2014. Like the first campaign, backers got to vote on the subject of one of the books; they chose Shadow of the Colossus.

List of books

Season 1

Season 2

Season 3

Season 4

Season 5

Special

Season 6

Anthologies

References

External links

Book publishing companies based in California
Books about video games
Kickstarter-funded publications
2013 establishments in California
Publishing companies established in 2013
Companies based in Los Angeles
American companies established in 2013